Acid yellow may refer to:

 Naphthol yellow S (acid yellow 1)
 Yellow 2G (acid yellow 17)
 Metanil yellow (acid yellow 36)
 Martius yellow (acid yellow 24)